The 1987 Labatt National Curling Trials were held April 19-25, 1987 at the Max Bell Arena in Calgary, Alberta. They were held to determine the Canadian National men's and women's Teams for the demonstration curling event at the 1988 Winter Olympics.

Men

Teams

Final standings

Tiebreakers
Werenich 8-6 Howard
Lukowich 9-4 Sparkes

Playoffs

Semifinal

Final

Women

Teams

Final standings

Tiebreakers
Sanders 7-0 Jones
Sanders 9-2 Fahlman

Playoffs

Semifinal

Final

Sources

 
2017 Canadian Olympic Curling Trials Media Guide: 1987 Trials

Olympic Curling Trials, 1987
Canadian Olympic Curling Trials
Curling competitions in Calgary
Canadian Olympic Curling